Beckley Bog is a sphagnum-heath-black spruce bog located near Norfolk in Litchfield County, Connecticut. It is the southernmost sphagnum heath bog in New England. The peat moss is over 51 feet deep. It was declared a National Natural Landmark in May 1977.

It was purchased by The Nature Conservancy and the Conservation and Research Foundation in 1957. It was the first purchase by the Conservancy in Connecticut  and is now part of the Northwest Highlands group of preserves.

References

External links
Nature Conservancy Northwest Highlands

National Natural Landmarks in Connecticut
Nature Conservancy preserves
Protected areas of Litchfield County, Connecticut
Nature reserves in Connecticut
Bogs of the United States
Wetlands of Connecticut
Landforms of Litchfield County, Connecticut